Michael Dixon may refer to:

Michael Dixon (basketball) (born 1990), basketball player
Mike Dixon (footballer, born 1937) (born 1937), English footballer for Coventry and Luton
Mike Dixon (footballer, born 1943) (1943–1993), English footballer for Reading and Aldershot
Michael Dixon (doctor), British General Practitioner and former chair of the NHS Alliance
Michael Dixon (museum director) (born 1956), former Director of the Natural History Museum; Principal of Green Templeton College, Oxford since 2020
Michael Dixon (politician), U.S. political activist 
Michael Dixon (rugby league) (born 1971), rugby league footballer for Scotland, Hull F.C., and Hull Kingston Rovers
Michael Dixon (umpire) (born 1954), English cricket umpire
Mike Dixon (biathlete) (born 1962), Briton who competed at six Winter Olympics
Mike Dixon (Brookside), character in British soap opera Brookside
Mike Dixon (conductor), British conductor
Mike Dixon, owner of Major League Productions

See also
Michael Dickson (disambiguation)